Kafentina Rural LLG is a local-level government (LLG) of Eastern Highlands Province, Papua New Guinea.

Wards
01. Kompri
02. Krevanofi
03. Avani
04. Ababe, Keka (Ifompaga) & Hayafaga
05. Yohotegave
06. Fomurenave
07. Finintugu
08. Kamanonka
09. Tebega
10. Tebenofi
11. Henganofi Station

References

Local-level governments of Eastern Highlands Province